() is a Japanese manufacturer of power transmission and roller chain products. It was founded in Osaka in 1917 as a bicycle chain manufacturer. Later it became the first roller chain manufacturer in Japan approved by Japanese Industrial Standards.
Tsubakimoto Chain has the world's largest market share for steel chains for general industrial applications and enjoys the world's top market share for timing drive systems for automobiles. The company is headquartered in Osaka, with its main manufacturing base in Kyotanabe, Kyoto.

History
Tsubakimoto Chain was established in 1917 by Setsuzo Tsubakimoto in Kita-ku, Osaka as a private enterprise known as Tsubakimoto Shoten manufacturing bicycle chains. They soon moved to roller chain and conveyor equipment production, ceasing bicycle chain manufacture in 1928. The following year, they registered as Tsubakimoto Chain Manufacturing Company.

With the completion of their Tsurumi Plant in Osaka in 1940, they launched as a joint-stock company with capital of three million yen in 1941. Setsuzo Tsubakimoto was appointed the company's first president. They changed their name to Tsubakimoto Chain Co. in 1970.

In 2000, Tsubaki completed work on its new, larger Kyotanabe Plant to meet its increasing production levels. With nearly 100,000 m2 of building floor space, the plant is the world's largest chain manufacturing facility.

Products
Roller chain and sprockets, toothed belts and pulleys, hose and cable carrier systems, shaft coupling/locking, reducer/variable speed drives, motion control/clutch, overload protectors, linear actuators, automotive timing belt systems, conveyance, sorting, and storage systems, bulk handling systems, metalworking chips handling and coolant processing systems.

Profile
Corporate name: 
Headquarters: Nakanoshima Mitsui Building, 6F, 3-3-3, Nakanoshima, Kita-ku, Osaka, 530-0005 Japan 
Kyotanabe Plant: 1-1-3, Kannabidai, Kyotanabe, Kyoto 610-0380 Japan
Saitama Plant: 20, Shinko, Hanno, Saitama 357-8510 Japan
Kyoto Plant: 1-1, Kotari -Kuresumi, Nagaokakyo, Kyoto 617-0833 Japan
Hyogo Plant: 1140, Asazuma-cho, Kasai, Hyogo 679-0181 Japan

Principal Group Companies

Japan
Tsubakimoto Custom Chain Co.
Tsubakimoto Sprocket Co.
Tsubaki Yamakyu Chain Co.
Tsubakimoto Iron Casting Co., Ltd.
Tsubakimoto Machinery Co.
Tsubakimoto Bulk Systems Corp.
Tsubakimoto Mayfran Inc.
Tsubaki Support Center Co.

Overseas

Americas
U.S. Tsubaki Holdings, Inc. (headquarters)
U.S. Tsubaki Power Transmission, LLC (manufacturing base)
U.S. Tsubaki Automotive LLC (manufacturing base)
U.S. Tsubaki Industrial LLC (manufacturing base)
Tsubaki Kabelschlepp America, Inc.
Tsubaki Brasil Equipamentos Industriais Ltda.
Central Conveyor Company, LLC
Central Process Engineering, LLC
Electrical Insights, LLC
KCI, Incorporated
Tsubaki of Canada Limited (headquarters and manufacturing base)
Mayfran International. Incorporated
Conergics International LLC
Press Room Techniques Co.
Tsubakimoto Automotive Mexico S.A. de C.V. (manufacturing base)

Europe
Tsubakimoto Europe B.V.
Tsubakimoto U.K. Ltd.
Tsubaki Deutschland GmbH
Tsubaki Automotive Czech Republic s.r.o.
Tsubaki Ibérica Power Transmission S.L.
Tsubaki KabelSchlepp GmbH
KabelSchlepp GmbH - Hunsborn
KabelSchlepp Italia S.A.R.L.
Metool Products Limited
KabelSchlepp France S.A.R.L.
Kabelschlepp Systemtechnik spol. s r.o.
OOO Tsubaki KabelSchlepp
Schmidberger GmbH
Mayfran U.K. Limited
Mayfran GmbH
Mayfran Limburg B.V.
Mayfran International B.V.
Mayfran France S.A.R.L.
Mayfran CZ s.r.o.

Indian Ocean Rim
Tsubakimoto Singapore Pte. Ltd.
PT Tsubaki Indonesia Manufacturing
PT Tsubaki Indonesia Trading
Tsubaki Power Transmission (Malaysia) Sdn. Bhd.
Tsubakimoto (Thailand) Co., Ltd.
Tsubaki India Power Transmission Private Limited
Tsubakimoto Vietnam Co., Ltd.
Tsubakimoto Philippines Corporation
Tsubaki Australia Pty. Limited
Tsubakimoto Automotive (Thailand) Co., Ltd.
Tsubaki Motion Control (Thailand) Co., Ltd.
Kabelschlepp India Private Limited
Tsubaki Conveyor Systems India Private Limited

China
Tsubakimoto Chain (Shanghai) Co., Ltd.
Tsubaki Motion Control (Shanghai) Co., Ltd.
Tsubakimoto Automotive (Shanghai) Co., Ltd.
Tsubaki Everbest Gear (Tianjin) Co., Ltd.
Tsubakimoto Chain (Tianjin) Co., Ltd.
Tsubakimoto Bulk Systems (Shanghai) Corp.
Kabelschlepp China Co., Ltd.
Tianjin Tsubakimoto Conveyor Systems Co., Ltd.
Tsubakimoto Mayfran Conveyor (Shanghai) Co., Ltd.
Tsubaki CAPT Power Transmission (Shijiazhuang) Co., Ltd.

Korea and Taiwan
Taiwan Tsubakimoto Co. (manufacturing base)
Taiwan Tsubakimoto Trading Co., Ltd.
Tsubakimoto Automotive Korea Co., Ltd.
Tsubakimoto Korea Co., Ltd.

News

U.S. Tsubaki Power Transmission LLC Company Profile (a subsidiary of Tsubakimoto Chain Co.)

2022
Roller chain upgrade reduces costs for pizza making operation

2019
U.S. Tsubaki Holdings Inc.’s Conveyor Operations Division and U.S. Automotive LLC open a new manufacturing facility in Portland, TN

2018
Extracting the benefits of customised chain solutions
Tsubakimoto Chain Installs PV System at Its New Manufacturing Plant
New State Capital Sells Central Conveyor to U.S. Tsubaki Holdings, Inc.

2016
Maintenance-Free Chain Helps Provide Long Term Flood Control

2015
GM Announces 2014 Supplier of the Year Winners

2014
For When an Ordinary Chain Just Won’t Do
Mahindra Conveyor Systems group firm forms joint venture with Japanese Tsubaki
Patent Issued for Conveyor Chain
Tsubakimoto Chain Co.: Patent Issued for Silent Chain Having Deformable Guide Plates
Toyota Supplier Sees China Sales Doubling on Orders From VW, GM

2013
Toyota supplier considers China capacity boost on VW, GM orders

2012
U.S. Tsubaki Launches New Interactive Website and Centralized Product Platform to Better Serve Engineers (Packing Digest)
Cam clutches meet safety requirements (Mining Weekly)
Cable carriers with multiple band design master high additional loads (Materials Handling World Magazine)
Tsubakimoto Expects Record Auto-Parts Sales on Carmakers Rebound (Bloomberg Businessweek)

2011
1st foreign plant completed in BJFEZ (Korea Times)
Toyota Announces Supplier of the Year Awards (Reliable Plant)
How do we break the cycle that swings from lowest cost to highest quality? (Industrial Technology)
Getting more life from roller chain (Motion System Design)
FlexLink and Tsubakimoto Chain Co. signed JV (Flexlink)
Tsubaki is named IADA supplier of the year in its first term of partnership (Process and Control Today)

2010
Tsubaki buys KabelSchlepp to lead its cable-carrier division (Drives & Controls)
Taking Aim at 21st Century "Korean Special Procurement Demand" (Nikkei Business)

2009
Electric Cars Push Japan Engine Parts Makers to Crisis Mode (Bloomberg)
Energy-saving conveyor chains from Tsubaki (European Design Engineer Magazine)
Japan's Tsubakimoto Chain to build South Korean Plant (Nikkei)
Tsubakimoto Chain Co. ranks 24th overall in the latest Patent Scorecard (Wall Street Journal - Market Data Center)
Roller chain drives offer longer life, even in harsh environments (engineerlive)

2008
Chains offer better grip for packaging (engineerlive)
Tsubakimoto Chain 9-mth group results (Reuters)

2007
Specialty chains meet underground conveying demands (Mining Weekly)
Lube-free chain another link in product portfolio (Engineering News)

2006
Motion Industries Recognizes 26 Suppliers with Operational Excellence Supplier Partnership Awards 
Clarion, NGK, Tsubakimoto, Tokyo Steel: Japanese Equity Preview (Bloomberg article tracking the company's stock)
220 summer jobs lined up for youths (Article about U.S. Tsubaki involvement in a local jobs program)
Tsubaki Corrosion Resistant DP Series Chain Lasts Twice as Long as Standard Chain and is Still Going Strong at Scottish Water (Spotlight article in Process and Control Today)

2005
Tsubaki Low Noise Chain Gives the 'Silent Treatment' to Industrial Laundry Machines (Spotlight article in Process and Control Today)
Lady Godiva Rides In Coventry City Centre Again Thanks to Tsubaki's Weather Proof PC Chain (Spotlight article in Process and Control Today)

See also
 List of companies of Japan
 List of automobile manufacturers of Japan

References

External links
https://tsubakimoto.com/ - Corporate web site of Tsubakimoto Chain Co. in English
https://tsubakimoto.jp/ - Corporate web site of Tsubakimoto Chain Co. in Japanese
http://tsubaki.cn/ - Corporate web site of Tsubakimoto Chain Co. in Chinese

Companies listed on the Tokyo Stock Exchange
Manufacturing companies of Japan
Manufacturing companies based in Osaka
Engineering companies of Japan
Automotive companies of Japan
Japanese brands
Manufacturing companies established in 1917
Industrial machine manufacturers
Mining equipment companies
Manufacturers of industrial automation
Electrical equipment manufacturers
Machine manufacturers
Wire and cable manufacturers
Japanese companies established in 1917